Antonio Poli de Mathaeis (also Anto Matković or Antonio Poli de Matteis)(died 1588) was a Roman Catholic prelate who served as Bishop of Bosnia (1573–1588).

Biography
Antonio Poli de Mathaeis was ordained a friar in the Order of Friars Minor. On 26 Aug 1573, he was appointed during the papacy of Pope Gregory XIII as Bishop of Bosnia. He served as Bishop of Bosnia until his death in 1588. While bishop, he was the principal co-consecrator of Leonard Abel, Titular Bishop of Sidon (1582).

References 

16th-century Roman Catholic bishops in the Holy Roman Empire
Bishops appointed by Pope Gregory XIII
1588 deaths